Douglas Gordon Crusan Jr. (born July 26, 1946)  is a former American football offensive tackle who played seven seasons in the National Football League (NFL) for the Miami Dolphins. He played in Super Bowls VI, VII, and VIII. Crusan was the starting offensive tackle for the 1972 Super Bowl Champion Miami Dolphins, the only NFL team to finish a season with a perfect record (17–0). He was also the team captain for the 1967 Indiana Hoosiers football team and played defensive tackle in the 1968 Rose Bowl against Southern California and O. J. Simpson. Crusan was a first-round selection in the 1968 NFL Draft, picked by the Dolphins behind Larry Csonka. Crusan has been involved in the private sector as a senior business manager since retiring from the NFL, and has been actively involved in the NFLPA for 38 years.

References 

1946 births
Living people
People from Monessen, Pennsylvania
Players of American football from Pennsylvania
American football offensive tackles
Indiana Hoosiers football players
Miami Dolphins players